Baseball at the 1999 Pan American Games was held between July 25 and August 2 in Winnipeg, Manitoba, Canada. A total of nine teams competed: Brazil, Canada, Cuba, Dominican Republic, Guatemala, Mexico, Nicaragua, Panama, and the United States. The primary venue for this competition was CanWest Global Park, while Stonewall Quarry Park in Stonewall, Manitoba, was used as a secondary venue.

Cuba entered the competition as the seven-time defending champions, having won each gold medal dating back to 1971. They successfully defended their title, with the United States finishing second. The 1999 games were the first time professional baseball players were allowed to participate in the Pan American Games, and the top two teams qualified for the 2000 Summer Olympics.

Medal summary

Medal table

Medalists

Preliminary round

Pool A

Pool B

See also
 Softball at the 1999 Pan American Games

References

Events at the 1999 Pan American Games
1999
1999 Pan American Games
Pan American Games
1999 Pan American Games
1999 Pan American Games